The Snowy Monaro Regional Council is a local government area located in the Snowy Mountains and Monaro regions of New South Wales, Australia. The council was formed on 12 May 2016 through a merger of the Bombala, Cooma-Monaro and Snowy River shires.

The Mayor of the Snowy Monaro Regional Council is Narelle Davis.

Towns and localities 
The following towns are located within Snowy Monaro Regional Council:

The following localities are located within Snowy Monaro Regional Council:

Heritage listings
The Snowy Monaro Region has a number of heritage-listed sites, including:
 Bombala, Goulburn-Bombala railway: Bombala railway station
 Bombala, 91 Main Road: Crankies Plain Bridge
 Bredbo, Goulburn-Bombala railway: Bredbo Rail Bridge
 Cooma, Bradley Street: Cooma railway station
 Cooma, 59 - 61 Lambie Street: Royal Hotel
 Cooma, Sharp Street: Rock Bolting Development Site
 Eucumbene, Old Adaminaby and Lake Eucumbene
 Kiandra: Kiandra Courthouse
 Kiandra: Matthews Cottage

Demographics 
The population for the predecessor councils was estimated in 2013 as:
 in Bombala Shire
 in Cooma-Monaro Shire and
 in Snowy River Shire.

Council
The Snowy Monaro Regional Council comprises eleven Councillors elected proportionally in a single ward. The Councillors elected for a fixed four-year term of office with effect from 4 December 2021 were:

See also

 Local government areas of New South Wales

References

External links

 
2016 establishments in Australia